The Regionalverkehr Sächsische Schweiz-Osterzgebirge (RVSOE}) is a company that operates public transport services in the German state of Saxony. It is a member of the Verkehrsverbund Oberelbe (Upper Elbe Transport Association), a transport association that manages a common public transport structure for Dresden and its surrounding areas.

The company operates around 240 buses on 19 urban bus routes and 72 regional bus routes, 10 ferries on 8 ferry routes, and 16 trams on one tram route.

The services of the VSOE include:

 Urban bus services in the town of Dippoldiswalde
 Urban bus services in the town of Freital
 Urban bus services in the town of Heidenau
 Urban bus services in the town of Neustadt in Sachsen
 Urban bus services in the town of Pirna
 Urban bus services in the town of Sebnitz
 Regional bus services in Saxon Switzerland
 Regional bus services in the Eastern Ore Mountains
 Ferry services on the River Elbe
 The Kirnitzschtal Tramway, a tourist oriented rural tram service

The new company is owned by the Landkreis Sächsische Schweiz-Osterzgebirge.

Gallery

References

External links 
 Regionalverkehr Sächsische Schweiz-Osterzgebirge

Sächsische Schweiz-Osterzgebirge
Transport in Saxony